Austria has participated in the Eurovision Young Dancers 5 times since its debut in 1987, most recently taking part in 2001.

Participation overview

See also
Austria in the Eurovision Song Contest
Austria in the Eurovision Young Musicians

External links 
 Eurovision Young Dancers

Countries in the Eurovision Young Dancers